Shuakhevi is a district of Georgia, in the autonomous republic of Adjara. Its main town is Shuakhevi.

Population: 20,120

Area: 588 km2

Politics
Shuakhevi Municipal Assembly (Georgian: შუახევის საკრებულო, Shuakhevi Sakrebulo)) is a representative body in Shuakhevi Municipality, consisting of 21 members which are elected every four years. The last election was held in October 2021. Omar Takidze of Georgian Dream was elected mayor.

See also 
 List of municipalities in Georgia (country)

External links 
 Districts of Georgia, Statoids.com

References

Municipalities of Adjara